"Lead Me to Water" is a song by Australian pop-rock band Southern Sons. It was released in September 1992 as the first single taken from their second studio album, Nothing But the Truth (1992). The song peaked at number 36 in Australia.

Track listing
CD single  (74321112742)

Weekly charts

References

External links
 "Lead Me to Water" by Southern Sons at Discogs

1992 songs
1992 singles
Southern Sons songs
Songs written by Phil Buckle
Bertelsmann Music Group singles